Morrich More is an extensive area of dune grassland with wetland communities, on the southern shore of the Dornoch Firth, Scotland.

Morrich More lies east of Tain, on the southern shore of the Dornoch Firth, Scotland. Offshore lie extensive areas of intertidal sandflat, including the tidal island of Innis Mhòr and the sand spit Paterson Island which provide shelter. The area includes the most extensive area of salt marsh in the Highlands.

Designations
Morrich More is a Site of Special Scientific Interest and forms part a Special Area of Conservation with Dornoch Firth.

Morrich More falls within the Dornoch Firth and Loch Fleet Special Protection Area, one of the best examples of a large complex estuary in northwest Europe, relatively unaffected by industrial development. Extensive sand-flats and mud-flats are backed by salt marsh and sand dunes with transitions to dune heath and Alder (Alnus glutinosa) woodland. The tidal flats support internationally important numbers of waterbirds on migration and in winter, and are the most northerly and substantial extent of intertidal habitat for wintering waterbirds in Europe.

The area is described as:

Footnotes

Sites of Special Scientific Interest in East Ross and Cromarty
Former islands of Scotland